Mohammed Khaled Hossain also known as Sajal Khaled was a Bangladeshi mountaineer and film director. He was the 5th Bangladeshi to reach the summit of Mount Everest. He reached the summit around 10:00am and 11:00am BST on May 20, 2013, and hoisted the flag of Bangladesh on the apex of the world. Descending from Mount Everest he died. The accident might have occurred a few hours after he had reached the peak.

Education 
Hossain studied at Adamjee Cantonment Public School & College. He passed his SSC in 1993 and HSC in 1995. He completed his bachelor's in Computer Science from the Bangalore University, India and Masters in Media Technology and Engineering from the University of Applied Science, Cologne, Germany. He also had a Diploma in Graphics, Animation and Web Engineering.

Family 
Hossain is the youngest among the six children of his parents. His father is Abdul Aziz Shakider, a retired deputy director of Bangladesh Bank, and mother is Sufia Begum. He married Tahmina Khan Shaily, Entrepreneur. Their only son is Susmit Hossain.

Success on Mount Everest
Hossain got to the peak between 10:00am and 11:00am on the day. The accident might have occurred a few hours after he had reached the summit.

Other expeditions
 Mount Frey (Sikkim, India), 2006
 Makalu, 2009
 Himalaya Bangladesh-Nepal Friendship Peak, 2010
 Sindhu Chuli Mount (Nepal), 2011

Work
Hossain was the director of the movie "Kajoler Dinratri". For making this movie he got the national grant in 2012 and it was released in 2013. Beside this full-length film, he had also made several documentary films. Among them Ekattorer Shobdoshena, Bangladesh, The Land of Smiles, and A Climatic report from Bangladesh are the most notable ones.

See also
List of Mount Everest records

References

External links 
 

1979 births
2013 deaths
Bangladeshi summiters of Mount Everest
Bangladeshi mountain climbers
Mountaineering deaths on Mount Everest
Bangladeshi film directors